Actinoschoenus glabrispiculus, commonly known as smooth actinoschoenus, is a sedge in the sedge family, Cyperaceae that is native to Western Australia throughout parts of the Kimberley region.

References

glabrispiculus
Plants described in 2015
Angiosperms of Western Australia
Taxa named by Russell Lindsay Barrett
Taxa named by Barbara Lynette Rye
Taxa named by Matthew David Barrett